The Myanmar women's cricket team toured Singapore and Indonesia in April 2019 for a total of five Women's Twenty20 International (WT20I) matches, playing three WT20I matches in Singapore followed by two in Indonesia.

Singapore

The first leg of Myanmar's tour was a trip to Singapore to play three (WT20I) matches at the Indian Association Ground. The series took place from 18 to 20 April 2019. Myanmar won the series 2-0, with the third match abandoned after the toss had been won by Singapore. This was the first time that Singapore had hosted a WT20I series.

W20I series

1st WT20I

2nd WT20I

3rd WT20I

Indonesia

The second leg of the tour saw the Myanmar team travel to Indonesia to play in the Kartini Cup at the Udayana Cricket Ground in Bali. The series took place from 21 to 28 April 2019 and also saw a number of local club sides competing alongside the women's national teams of Indonesia and Myanmar. The two matches between the national sides in the group stage were granted WT20I status. Indonesia won both of these matches by comfortable margins of 73 and 63 runs, respectively.

WT20I series

1st WT20I

2nd WT20I

References

External links
 Series home at ESPN Cricinfo (Singapore)
 Series home at ESPN Cricinfo (Indonesia) 

Cricket in Myanmar
Cricket in Singapore
Cricket in Indonesia
International cricket competitions in 2018–19
Women in Myanmar